Healing Springs is an unincorporated community in Bath County, Virginia, in the United States.

History
Healing Springs takes its name from the hot springs found nearby.

Notes

References

Unincorporated communities in Bath County, Virginia
Unincorporated communities in Virginia